Scarlett Pomers (born November 28, 1988) is a former American actress and singer-songwriter. Her most recognizable roles have been as Naomi Wildman on Star Trek: Voyager (1998–2001) and Kyra Hart on the television series Reba (2001–2007). Her debut EP, titled Insane, was released January 7, 2010.

Early life
Scarlett Noel Pomers was a fan of hard rock from an early age. She began singing and guitar lessons as a child. When she was three years old, an agent at a local shopping mall suggested to her mother Michelle that Scarlett get into the acting business. Scarlett began doing small jobs until they found an agent they both liked.

Career

Acting
Pomers made her acting debut at the age of three in Michael Jackson's music video, "Heal the World" (1992). She then began doing commercials and has filmed over three dozen to date. She has also starred in a number of television shows, including Judging Amy, That's Life, and Touched by an Angel.

Pomers was five years old when she made her debut on the silver screen in The Baby-Sitters Club. She also appeared in Slappy and the Stinkers, Happy, Texas, Erin Brockovich, and TV-movie Geppetto, as well as appearing on the Disney Channel film, A Ring of Endless Light.

Pomers' first major role began in 1998 as Naomi Wildman on the UPN sci-fi program Star Trek: Voyager. She appeared in 17 episodes over three years and won a Young Artist Award for Best Performance in a Drama Series: Supporting Young Actress. She then joined the cast of the WB series Reba, playing Kyra Hart, the middle child of the titular character. Pomers stayed with the show until it ended in 2007.

Pomers has also appeared as a judge for PAX TV's 2004–05 series America's Most Talented Kids.

In 2014 Pomers stated she was "pretty much [done]" with acting save for some voiceover work, and was making a career in photography and jewelry design.

Music
In an interview with Modern Guitars Magazine, they asked Pomers to talk about how she and her band got together.

She replied, "I've been singing since I was about six-years-old and I was supposed to finish an album last year when I was on hiatus from Reba, but I dislocated my kneecap for the third time and had to have surgery to keep it from happening again.

During my four month recovery, I was pretty unhappy that I couldn't finish working with the writers and producers I was scheduled to do the album with. So by the fourth month I was getting around in my brace and making progress in my physical therapy and my mom said I could put a band together and rehearse sitting down until the brace came off. By that time maybe we could do a show.

What I didn't know was how much fun it would be and now it has become the most amazing experience I've ever had! All of my guys love classic rock and they are really talented and fun to work with."

As a singer, Pomers founded the band SCARLETT, sometimes known as the "Scarlett Pomers Band," which played at venues including the Knitting Factory, House of Blues, Club One-Seven, The Roxy, and the Whisky a Go Go.

Pomers' debut EP, Insane, was released on January 7, 2010, through her official website, CDbaby.com, and iTunes. The album consists of five tracks.

Pomers covered an AC/DC classic, "It's a Long Way to the Top (If You Wanna Rock 'n' Roll)", in a tribute album to the band titled Rock & Roll Train: A Millennium Tribute To AC/DC. It was released December 10, 2010 on iTunes.

In 2014 Pomers stated she was still involved in music, "but I do it mostly for myself and not for money, not for a living. There’s no money in it anyway." Her musical projects at the time included industrial metal and writing songs for the mandolin, which she had learnt to play.

Personal life
In late 2005, Pomers checked into an anorexia nervosa treatment facility. Scarlett's character, Kyra, was absent from most of the fifth season of Reba, having only appeared in two episodes out of twenty-two. She was out of the facility by January 2006, became an ambassador for the National Eating Disorders Association, and began an organization called Arch-Angels which raises money for people who suffer from eating disorders, but cannot afford treatment. Her efforts led Teen People magazine to name her one of the 20 teens who will change the world.

Pomers returned to the set of Reba and appeared in season six until the show ended in 2007. Pomers, who is a vegetarian, began practicing Kundalini yoga in June 2006 after reading a book about Golden Bridge studio director Gurmukh Kaur Khalsa, and earned her teaching certificate in the practice. "Yoga always made me feel really good about myself. It was the final step of letting go of the demon."

Her eating disorder was referenced in the first episode of season six. Upon entering the set to a thunderous round of applause in Season 6, episode 1 (after being absent for most of season 5) Reba asked her character Kyra "Where have you been?" to which Kyra replies, "I went to get something to eat." Later in the same episode, she walks towards the kitchen when Van (Steve Howey) asks, "Where are you going?" She responds, "Just gonna go grab something to eat." Van replies "See you next year."

Filmography

Film

Television

Theatre

References

https://www.aiowiki.com/wiki/Scarlett_Pomers

External links
Scarlett Pomers Official Myspace
Scarlett Pomers on Twitter

Scarlett Pomers at the Country Music Television

Scarlett Pomers on Facebook
Scarlett Pomers on Flickr

1988 births
20th-century American actresses
21st-century American actresses
American child actresses
American child singers
American film actresses
American television actresses
Actresses from California
Musicians from Riverside, California
Living people
Actresses from Riverside, California
21st-century American singers
21st-century American women singers